Iacovos (Makis) Keravnos (born 18 December 1951) is a Cypriot banker and politician. He served as a Minister of Labour and Social Insurance from 03/03/2003 until 18/05/2004 and from 19 May 2004 until 30 August 2005 Minister of Finance of Cyprus. Since then (1 September 2005-2014 ), he was the CEO of Cyprus' third largest bank, Hellenic Bank Public Company Limited Group.
Was the first Minister of Finance after the accession of Cyprus to the EU and represented Cyprus on various Councils of Ministers of the EU. In May 2004, led Cyprus to the Exchange Rate Mechanism, which was the first step towards integration into the Eurozone.

In 2006 appointed by the Council of Ministers as chairman of the board of directors of the Cyprus Broadcasting Corporation for a full term in office (2006-2009).

Appointed member of the board of directors of Hellenic Bank on 20 July 2006 and also chairman of the board of directors of Hellenic Alico Life Insurance Company Limited.

References
previous ministers of labour https://web.archive.org/web/20190730111519/http://www.mlsi.gov.cy/mlsi/mlsi.nsf/mlsi10_gr/mlsi10_gr?OpenDocument

1951 births
Living people
Cyprus Ministers of Finance
Greek Cypriot people
Cypriot businesspeople
Cyprus Ministers of Labour and Social Insurance